Cochlodina is a genus of air-breathing land snails in the terrestrial pulmonate gastropod mollusk family Clausiliidae, the door snails.

Distribution
Species within this genus occur in Europe and North Africa.

Species
Species within this genus include:
 Cochlodina bidens (Linnaeus, 1758)
 Cochlodina cerata (Rossmässler, 1836)
 Cochlodina comensis (Pfeiffer, 1850) 
 Cochlodina commutata (Rossmässler, 1836)
 Cochlodina costata (Pfeiffer, 1828)
 Cochlodina curta (Rossmässler, 1836)  
 Cochlodina dubiosa (Clessin, 1882)
 † Cochlodina esuae H. Nordsieck, 2013 	 
 Cochlodina fimbriata (Rossmässler, 1835)
 Cochlodina inaequalis (A. Schmidt, 1868)	 
 Cochlodina incisa (Küster, 1876)
 Cochlodina kuesteri (Rossmässler, 1836)
 Cochlodina laminata (Montagu, 1803)		 
 Cochlodina liburnica (Wagner, 1919)	 	 
 Cochlodina marisi (Pfeiffer, 1868)	 
 Cochlodina meisneriana (Shuttleworth, 1843)  
 † Cochlodina oppoliensis H. Nordsieck, 1981 
 Cochlodina orthostoma (Menke, 1828)*
 † Cochlodina perforata (O. Boettger, 1877) 
 † Cochlodina prolaminata (Sacco, 1889) 
 † Cochlodina reinensis Harzhauser & Neubauer in Harzhauser et al., 2014 
 Cochlodina triloba (Boettger, 1878)

References

 Nordsieck, H. (1969). Die Cochlodina-Arten des westlichen Mittelmeerraumes. Archiv für Molluskenkunde, 99 (1/2): 21–25. Frankfurt am Main.
 Nordsieck, H. (1969). Zur Anatomie und Systematik der Clausilien, VI. Genitalsystem und Systematik der Clausiliidae, besonders der Unterfamilie Alopiinae. Archiv für Molluskenkunde, 99 (5/6): 247–265. Frankfurt am Main
 Bank, R. A. (2017). Classification of the Recent terrestrial Gastropoda of the World. Last update: July 16, 2017
 Nordsieck, H. (1972). Fossile Clausilien, I. Clausilien aus dem Pliozän W-Europas. Archiv für Molluskenkunde. 102(4/6): 165–188.

External links
 Férussac, A.E.J.P.F. d'Audebard de. (1821-1822). Tableaux systématiques des animaux mollusques classés en familles naturelles, dans lesquels on a établi la concordance de tous les systèmes; suivis d'un Prodrome général pour tous les mollusques ou fluviatiles, vivantes ou fossiles. Paris, 1821 et 1822. Livraison 9: 1-24 (Quarto edition) [Folio edition: 1-32] (6-IV-1821); livr. 10: 25-48 (Quarto) [Folio: 33-56] (26-V-1821); livr. 11: 49-72 (Quarto) [Folio: 57-76] (13-VII-1821); livr. 12: 73-88 (Quarto) [Folio: 77-92] (21-IX-1821); livr. 13: 89-110 (Quarto) [Folio: 93-114] (10-XI-1821); livr. 14: i-xxiv (Quarto) (16-II-1822); livr. 15: xxv-xlvii[i] (Quarto) (13-IV-1822); livr. 16: 1-27 (Quarto) (16-VII-1822). – Paris / London (Arthus Bertrand / G.B. Sowerby).

Clausiliidae
Gastropod genera